The Surrey Eagles are a junior "A" ice hockey team based in Surrey, British Columbia, Canada. They are members of the Mainland Division of the British Columbia Hockey League (BCHL). They play their home games at South Surrey Arena.

History

New Westminster Royals
The city of New Westminster had been the home of a number of professional ice hockey teams, all named the New Westminster Royals, in the 1910s, 1940s and 1950s.  In 1962, a New Westminster Royals junior ice hockey team joined the Pacific Coast Junior Hockey League (PCJHL).  After the Royals won five-straight league championships, the PCJHL merged with the British Columbia Junior Hockey League (BCJHL) in 1967.  They were Abbott Cup finalists in 1967, during the 1967 Memorial Cup playdowns. In 1971, the now Junior A Royals franchise went dormant when the Estevan franchise of the major junior Western Canada Hockey League relocated and become the New Westminster Bruins.  In 1981, the Bruins left New Westminster and the Royals were reactivated for two seasons.  In 1983, a different major junior Bruins' team relocated from Nanaimo to New Westminster and the Royals again went dormant.  In 1988, the Bruins left and the Royals were reactivated.  The Royals won the 1989–90 Fred Page Cup as BCHL playoff champions.

Future NHL star Cliff Ronning was a notable member of the early 1980s Royals' squad. Future convicted fraudster Frank Biller played for the Royals from 1988 to 1990.

Surrey
In 1991, the New Westminster Royals relocated to nearby Surrey, British Columbia. For the first four seasons in South Surrey, the Eagles did not make it past the quarterfinals in the playoffs. In 1997, their fifth season, the Eagles finished with a record of 47–7–6 for 100 points and won the BCHL championship by defeating the Vernon Vipers in the Subway Cup.  The Eagles then beat the Rocky Mountain Junior Hockey League champions Cranbrook Colts and the Fort McMurray Oil Barons of the Alberta Junior Hockey League to earn a berth in the Royal Bank Cup.  In the tournament, held in Summerside, Prince Edward Island, the Eagles went 3–1 in the round-robin and beat the Kanata Valley Lasers 4–2 in the semifinal before losing to the host Summerside Western Capitals 4–3 in the championship game.

In the following 1997–98 season, the South Surrey Eagles won the Royal Bank Cup with the tournament held in Nanaimo, British Columbia, defeating the Weyburn Red Wings 4–1 in the final.

The Eagles' following seasons also were successful, losing the league title to eventual Royal Bank Cup winners Vernon Vipers in 1999, then twice losing in the league semifinal, and won the league title in 2005 over the Vernon Vipers four games to one. In the 2005 Doyle Cup series, they lost to Camrose Kodiaks four games to one.

In 2012–13, the Eagles won the British Columbia Hockey League championship by defeating the Penticton Vees in six games. They then won the inaugural Western Canada Cup with a 4–2 win over the Brooks Bandits in the championship game.  At the Royal Bank Cup, the Surrey Eagles went 3–1 in the round-robin to finish in second place, but lost to the host Summerside Western Capitals in overtime in the semifinal game.

Season-by-season record
Note: GP = Games played, W = Wins, L = Losses, T = Ties, OTL = Overtime Losses, Pts = Points, GF = Goals for, GA = Goals against, PIM = Penalties in minutes

NHL alumni

Awards and trophies

Royal Bank Cup
 1998

Western Canada Cup
 2013

Abbott Cup
 1998
 1997
 1990

Doyle Cup
 1998
 1997
 1990

Mowat Cup
 2005
 1998
 1997
 1990

Fred Page Cup
 2013
 2005
 1998
 1997
 1990

Cliff McNabb Memorial Trophy
 2013
 2005
 1998
 1997
 1990
 1989
 1982

Ron Boileau Memorial Trophy"
 2013Chevrolet Cup 1997
 1990
 1989Top Goaltender Trophy Michael Santaguida: 2013
Bob Bell: 1991
Cory Cadden: 1990Brett Hull TrophyJohn McNabb: 1999
Shane Kuss: 1997
Mark Karpen: 1990
Jeff McLean: 1989Wally Forslund Memorial TrophyPeter Wishloff/Chris Peck: 1997
Bob Bell/Todd Jones: 1991
Cory Cadden/Todd Jones: 1990Joe Tennant Memorial TrophyMark Holick: 1999
Rick Lanz: 1997
Pat Smith: 1993
Harvey Smyl: 1991
John Olver: 1990Bob Fenton TrophyScott Knowles: 2008
Shane Kuss: 1997Top Defenceman Trophy Brian Drapluk : 2014
 Devon Toews : 2013
Nathan Oystrick: 2002
Jacob Ficenec: 1998
Derry Menard: 1991Vern Dye Memorial TrophyJohn McNabb: 1999
Greg Hadden: 1991
Jeff McLean: 1989Bruce Allison Memorial Trophy'''
Scott Gomez: 1997

See also
List of ice hockey teams in British Columbia

References

External links
 Official website of the Surrey Eagles
 Official website of the BCHL

British Columbia Hockey League teams
Sport in Surrey, British Columbia
Ice hockey teams in British Columbia
Ice hockey clubs established in 1962
1962 establishments in British Columbia